Plaza de almas (Soul's Square) is a 1997 Argentine drama film, written directed by Fernando Díaz.
The picture was produced by Daniel Burman, Fernando Díaz, and Diego Dubcovsky.
It stars Olga Zubarry, Norman Briski, Vera Fogwill, and others.

Plot
Marcelo makes a living as a painter in a Buenos Aires square, with other street artists.
He's sad and lonely because his family's does not get along.
He lives with his grandfather and becomes romantically involved with a budding actress. He devotes much of his time to her, and dreams of a happy future together.

She, however, has other plans, and events take a dramatic turn when she is forced to undergo an abortion.
Marcelo also discovers the reasons for his family's separation and makes Marcelo face reality more clearly.

Cast
 Alejandro Gance as Marcelo
 Olga Zubarry as grandmother
 Norman Briski as grandfather
 Vera Fogwill as Laura
 Thelma Biral as mother
 Villanueva Cosse as the director
 Roberto Carnaghi
 Rolly Serrano
 Guadalupe Martínez Uría
 María L. Cali
 Maximiliano Ghione

Distribution
The film was first presented at the Mar del Plata Film Festival in November 1997.  It opened wide in Argentina on June 4, 1998.

In the United States it screened at the Miami Hispanic Film Festival on April 24, 1999.

The picture was shown at various film festivals, including: the Biarritz International Festival of Latin American Cinema, France; the Gramado Film Festival, Gramado, Brazil; and others.

Awards
Wins
 Mar del Plata Film Festival: Best Ibero-American Film, Fernando Díaz; 1997.
 Biarritz International Festival of Latin American Cinema: Audience Award; Fernando Díaz; 1998.
 Argentine Film Critics Association Awards: Silver Condor; Best Supporting Actress, Olga Zubarry; 1999.
 Lleida Latin-American Film Festival: ICCI Screenplay Award Fernando Díaz; 1999.

Nominations
 Argentine Film Critics Association Awards: Silver Condor, Best New Actor, Alejandro Gancé; Best Supporting Actor, Norman Briski; 1999.
 Gramado Film Festival, Gramado, Brazil: Golden Kikito, Best Film, Fernando Díaz; 1998.

References

External links
 
 Plaza de almas at the cinenacional.com 
 

1997 films
1997 drama films
Argentine independent films
1990s Spanish-language films
Argentine drama films
1997 independent films